Rogelio Wilfrido Delgado Casco (born 12 October 1959) is a retired football central defender from Paraguay.

Club career
At the club level, Delgado played for Olimpia Asunción, where he won the Copa Libertadores and Intercontinental Cup in 1979, and six Paraguayan league titles.

He also played for Independiente of Argentina, where he won the 1988–1989 league championship, and for Universidad de Chile, where he won the 1994 Chilean league championship.

After retiring as a player, Delgado took up coaching. He came out of retirement to play one game for Colo-Colo in the 1995 edition of the Supercopa.

International career
Delgado was a member of the Paraguayan squad at the 1979 FIFA World Youth Championship. He made his full international debut for the Paraguay national football team on 2 June 1983 in a friendly match against Uruguay (0-0). He obtained a total number of 53 international caps, scoring six goals for the national side. He was a member of the Paraguay squad at the 1986 FIFA World Cup in Mexico. He also played in three editions of the Copa América in 1983, 1987 and 1989.

Honours

Club
Olimpia
 Paraguayan Primera División (6): 1978, 1979, 1981, 1982, 1983, 1985
 Copa Libertadores (1): 1979
 Copa Intercontinental (1): 1979
 Copa Interamericana (1): 1979

Independiente
 Argentine Primera (1): 1988–1989

Universidad de Chile
 Primera División de Chile (1): 1994

References

External links
 Olimpia Idols player profile 
 Profile 

1959 births
Living people
Paraguayan footballers
Club Olimpia footballers
Club Atlético Independiente footballers
Universidad de Chile footballers
Colo-Colo footballers
Argentine Primera División players
Chilean Primera División players
Paraguayan expatriate footballers
Expatriate footballers in Argentina
Expatriate footballers in Chile
Expatriate football managers in Chile
Association football defenders
Paraguay under-20 international footballers
Paraguay international footballers
1986 FIFA World Cup players
1983 Copa América players
1987 Copa América players
1989 Copa América players
Sportspeople from Asunción
Paraguayan football managers
Deportes Antofagasta managers
Sportivo Luqueño managers